Koe o Kikasete may refer to:

"Koe o Kikasete" (Beni song), 2011
"Koe o Kikasete" (Big Bang song), 2009
"Koe o Kikasete" (Shizuka Kudo song), 1992